Lukas Heller (21 July 1930 – 2 November 1988) was a German-born screenwriter.

Biography
Heller was born to a Jewish family in Kiel. His father was political philosopher Hermann Heller. He was known for writing the screen adaptions for several Robert Aldrich films such as What Ever Happened to Baby Jane? (1962) and Hush...Hush, Sweet Charlotte (1964); for the later film he won an Edgar Award with Henry Farrell, who wrote the source text for both films.

Heller was married to Caroline (née Carter) who was an English Quaker. They had four children: British writers Bruno and Zoë Heller, Lucy Heller, and Emily Heller. His half-sister was the Swedish journalist Cordelia Edvardson.

He died on 2 November 1988 and was buried on the eastern side of Highgate Cemetery in London, England.

Filmography
Never Back Losers (1961)
Candidate for Murder (1962)
What Ever Happened to Baby Jane? (1962)
Hot Enough for June (1964)
Hush...Hush, Sweet Charlotte (1964) (with Henry Farrell)
The Flight of the Phoenix (1965)
The Dirty Dozen (1967) (with Nunnally Johnson)
The Killing of Sister George (1968) (with Frank Marcus)
Too Late the Hero (1970) (with Robert Aldrich and Robert Sherman)
Monte Walsh (1970) (with David Zelag Goodman)
The Deadly Trackers (1973) (with Samuel Fuller)
Damnation Alley (1977) (with Alan Sharp)
Son of Hitler (1979) (with Burkhard Driest)
Hitler's SS: Portrait in Evil (1985) (TV)
Blue City (1986)

References

External links

1930 births
1988 deaths
Burials at Highgate Cemetery
German male screenwriters
Jewish emigrants from Nazi Germany to the United Kingdom
Mass media people from Kiel
German male writers
Film people from Schleswig-Holstein
20th-century German screenwriters